Island Wars was a New Zealand reality television show, produced by Touchdown Television for TV2.

Description 
It was a reality TV show (actually a parody of reality game shows) that began airing in 2009 and is about the Kiwis and Aussies at war.

The other "contestants" are competitives of common reality TV show contestants.

 Hosts Mikey Havoc and Dave Fane
 NZ Team
 Laural Barrett, Miss Universe NZ 2007
 Logan Swann "Rugby League"
 "Anna Fitzgerald"
 "Jan Maree" "Comedian"
 "Danny (Cage) Devine"
 "Andrew Beattie"
 Aussie Team
 "Amelia Hunter" "Comedian"
 Craig Johnston "Australia's Man of The Land"
 "Jaime Wright"
 "Jason Stevens"
 "Evan Burrell"
 "Kaite Richardson"

At the end of the show, Johnston was the winner.

External links
 

Reality television series parodies
Island Wars
TVNZ 2 original programming